Randhia is a village on Saurashtra peninsula in Gujarat, western India. Randhia was formerly a princely state.

Villages in Amreli district